Gurten may refer to:

Gurten (beer), a brand of beer brewed at the Feldschlösschen brewery in Switzerland
Gurten (festival), a music festival held near Bern, Switzerland
Gurten (mountain), a mountain near the city of Bern, Switzerland
Gurten Funicular, a railway to the summit of the mountain
Gurten (Upper Austria), a municipality in the district of Ried im Innkreis in Upper Austria, Austria